Tomáš Šalata (born 8 February 1997) is a Slovak footballer who last played for SC Wieselburg as a centre-back.

Club career

AS Trenčín
Šalata made his professional debut for AS Trenčín against FK Železiarne Podbrezová on August 12, 2017.

References

External links
 AS Trenčín official club profile
 
 Futbalnet profile
 Tomáš Šalata at ÖFB

1997 births
Living people
Slovak footballers
Slovak expatriate footballers
Association football defenders
AS Trenčín players
FK Inter Bratislava players
FC Mauerwerk players
Slovak Super Liga players
2. Liga (Slovakia) players
3. Liga (Slovakia) players
Austrian Regionalliga players
Sportspeople from Šaľa
Slovak expatriate sportspeople in Austria
Expatriate footballers in Austria